is a railway station in the city of Ichinoseki, Japan, operated by East Japan Railway Company (JR East).

Lines
Shimizuhara Station is served by the Tōhoku Main Line, and is located 434.4 rail kilometers from the terminus of the line at Tokyo Station.

Station layout
The station has two opposed side platforms connected to the station building by a footbridge.  The station is unattended.

Platforms

History
Shimizuhara Station opened on 1 July 1955. The station was absorbed into the JR East network upon the privatization of the Japanese National Railways (JNR) on 1 April 1987.

Surrounding area

See also
 List of Railway Stations in Japan

External links

  

Railway stations in Iwate Prefecture
Tōhoku Main Line
Railway stations in Japan opened in 1955
Ichinoseki, Iwate
Stations of East Japan Railway Company